The 1984 Central Michigan Chippewas football team represented Central Michigan University in the Mid-American Conference (MAC) during the 1984 NCAA Division I-A football season. In their seventh season under head coach Herb Deromedi, the Chippewas compiled an 8–2–1 record (6–2–1 against MAC opponents), finished in third place in the MAC standings, and outscored their opponents, 282 to 141. The team played its home games in Kelly/Shorts Stadium in Mount Pleasant, Michigan, with attendance of 145,273 in seven home games.

The team's statistical leaders included quarterback Bob DeMarco with 1,427 passing yards, tailback Curtis Adams with 1,204 rushing yards, and split end John DeBoer with 831 receiving yards. Adams and defensive tackle Pat Brackett received the team's most valuable player award. Adams was also selected by the United Press International as a second-team player on the 1984 College Football All-America Team. Six Central Michigan players (Adams, Brackett, DeBoer, outside linebacker Steve Sklenar, linebacker Mike Bevier, and defensive back Jim Bowman) received first-team All-MAC honors.

Schedule

References

Central Michigan
Central Michigan Chippewas football seasons
Central Michigan Chippewas football